North American area code 928 is a telephone area code in the state of Arizona that was created in a split from area code 520 on June 23, 2001, due mainly to population gains in Tucson, Yuma, and Flagstaff. 928 covers northern, eastern, and western portions of Arizona. The area code encompasses areas such as Beaver Dam, the Grand Canyon, Flagstaff, Holbrook, Lake Havasu City, Littlefield, Kingman, Prescott, Sedona, Wickenburg, Winslow and Yuma, also serving the majority of Greenlee County. The Arizona portion of the Navajo Nation is served by the 928 area code. Some areas on the western and northern fringes of the Phoenix metropolitan area, such as Lake Pleasant Regional Park in Peoria, also fall within this area code.

Prior to October 2021, area code 928 had telephone numbers assigned for the central office code 988. In 2020, 988 was designated nationwide as a dialing code for the National Suicide Prevention Lifeline, which created a conflict for exchanges that permit seven-digit dialing. This area code was therefore scheduled to transition to ten-digit dialing by October 24, 2021.

See also
List of NANP area codes
North American Numbering Plan

References

External links

 List of exchanges from AreaCodeDownload.com, 928 Area Code

928
928
2001 establishments in Arizona